Archibald J. Sykes (24 September 1866 – 26 August 1957) was an Australian rules footballer who played for the Essendon Football Club in the Victorian Football League (VFL), and was involved in the club's 1897 premiership win.

Sykes played for Essendon for seven years in the then VFA in 1889–1890 and 1892–1896,  and in 1891, he played for Fremantle in Western Australia. Sykes was involved in three Essendon VFA premierships in 1892–1894. After Essendon joined the new Victorian Football League, Sykes played with the Bombers for one season (1897) where they won the premiership, the fourth of his career, before retiring at the end of 1897. Sykes also represented Victoria in 1893.

Notes

References
 Football Favorites, The Weekly Times, (Saturday, 18 May 1895), p.13
 Football: Season 1895 Senior Captains, The Weekly Times, (Saturday, 18 May 1895), p.10
 Maplestone, M., Flying Higher: History of the Essendon Football Club 1872–1996, Essendon Football Club, (Melbourne), 1996.

External links

1866 births
1957 deaths
Australian rules footballers from Victoria (Australia)
Essendon Football Club players
Essendon Football Club Premiership players
Geelong West Football Club players
One-time VFL/AFL Premiership players